This is a list of Austrian writers and poets.



A
Ilse Aichinger (1921–2016), writer
Peter Altenberg (1859–1910), writer and poet
Jean Améry (1912–1978), writer
Ernst Angel (1894–1986), writer, poet and psychologist
Ludwig Anzengruber (1839–1889), writer
H. C. Artmann (died 2000), poet and writer

B
Ingeborg Bachmann (1926–1973), poet
Hermann Bahr (1863–1934), playwright, novelist
Christoph W. Bauer (1968– ), novelist
Eduard von Bauernfeld, dramatist
Johann Beer (17th century), writer and composer
Thomas Bernhard (1931–1989), dramatist, novelist, poet, born in Cloister Heerlen, Netherlands
Edmund Blum (1874–1938)
Hermann Broch, writer
Max Brod (1884–1968), born in Prague, Austria-Hungary, wrote in German

C
Elias Canetti (1905–1994), writer (born in Rustschuk, Bulgaria), wrote in German, Nobel Prize in Literature 1981
Veza Canetti (1897–1963) poet, playwright, and short story writer
Otto Maria Carpeaux (1900–1978), literary critic and foremost historian of Literature 
Paul Celan, poet (born in Czernowitz, Austria-Hungary), wrote in German
Ada Christen (1839–1901), poet, short story writer, and writer of sketches

D
Robert Dassanowsky, Austrian-American poet
Michael Denis, poet
Heimito von Doderer (1896–1966), writer, born in Hadersdorf-Weidlingau near Vienna
Milo Dor, Austrian writer of Serbian origin

E
Klaus Ebner (born 1964), writer, born in Vienna
Marie von Ebner-Eschenbach, writer (style: psychological novelist)
Gustav Ernst, playwright and novelist

F
Lilian Faschinger, novelist, poet, and literary translator
Franzobel (real name: Stefan Griebl), writer
Sigmund Freud, philosopher, psychologist and founder of psychoanalysis
Alfred Fried, writer, pacifist and Nobel Peace Prize winner in 1911
Erich Fried, poet and novelist
Egon Friedell, author, journalist and actor
Marianne Fritz, writer and novelist

G
Karl-Markus Gauß (born 1954), essayist, Salzburg
Karin Gayer (born 1969), writer, Mödling and Vienna
Thomas Glavinic (born 1972), writer, Graz
Heinrich Glücksmann (1864–1947), writer
Constantin Göttfert (born 1979), writer
Franz Grillparzer (1791–1872), dramatist, Vienna

H
Wolf Haas, writer best known for his Brenner novels
Friedrich Halm (1806–1871)
Robert Hamerling (1830–1889), poet 
Peter Handke (born 1942), author, born in Griffen (Carinthia)
Josef Haslinger, writer
Friedrich Heer (1916–1983), historian and writer, Vienna
Ernst von Hesse-Wartegg (1851–1918), writer and traveller
Fritz Hochwälder, playwright
Hugo von Hofmannsthal, dramatist, writer
Ödön von Horváth (1901–1938), writer, born in Fiume (today Rijeka), Austria-Hungary

J
Ernst Jandl, experimental lyric
Elfriede Jelinek (born 1946), 2004 Nobel Prize in Literature

K
Eugenie Kain, writer, born in Linz, wrote in German
Franz Kafka, writer, born in Prague, Austria-Hungary (wrote in German)
Ernst Kein (1928-1985), writer, born in Vienna, wrote in German
Marie-Thérèse Kerschbaumer (born 1936), novelist, poet
Egon Erwin Kisch, writer, born in Prague, Austria-Hungary (wrote in German)
Werner Kofler (1947–2011), novelist
Ludwig von Köchel, writer, composer, botanist, music historian
Karl Kraus (1874–1936), essayist, poet, dramatist 
Anton Kuh, writer and journalist

L
Minna Lachs (1907–1993), educator and memoirist
Alexander Lernet-Holenia, novelist, poet, playwright
Nikolaus Lenau (1802–1850), poet
Cvetka Lipuš (born 1966), poet 
Mira Lobe (1913–1995), children's literature writer
Konrad Lorenz (1903–1989)

M
Rosa Mayreder, writer and suffragette
Friederike Mayröcker (1924–2021), contemporary writer
Robert Menasse, writer and publicist
Gustav Meyrink (1868–1932), writer
Frederic Morton (born 1924), journalist and novelist 
Eligius Franz Joseph von Münch-Bellinghausen, known as Friedrich Halm (1806–1871), writer and dramatist
Robert Musil, writer

N
Günther Nenning, journalist
Johann Nestroy, playwright
Christine Nöstlinger, writer (especially literature for children)

O
Andreas Okopenko, writer

P
Katharina Prato (1818–1897), cookbook writer
Leo Perutz, writer
Andreas P. Pittler (born 1964), writer
Thomas Pollan (born 1971)
Ursula Poznanski (born 1968), writer

R
Doron Rabinovici, Israeli-Austrian writer, historian and essayist
Ferdinand Raimund, writer and dramatist
Christoph Ransmayr (born 1954), writer
Elisabeth Reichert
Neidhart von Reuental, writer and poet 13th century
Rainer Maria Rilke, poet and novelist
Peter Rosegger (1843–1918), writer
Joseph Roth, writer (Radetzkymarsch)

S
Ferdinand von Saar (19th century), dramatist and writer
Leopold von Sacher-Masoch, writer and journalist
Felix Salten (1869–1945), Jewish writer (most famous work Bambi)
Arthur Schnitzler, writer
Barbara Schurz, writer and painter
Werner Schwab, playwright
Erich Fritz Schweinburg, writer 
Robert Seethaler, writer and actor
Jura Soyfer, cabaret writer and political journalist, lived in Vienna
Manès Sperber, Austrian-French writer, philosopher and psychologist
Fritz Spiegl, journalist
Walter Johannes Stein, historian
Rudolf Steiner, writer and philosopher
Adalbert Stifter (died 1868), poet and artist
Bertha von Suttner, Nobel Peace Prize winner

T
Franziska Tausig, Holocaust survivor and memoirist
Friedrich Torberg (1908–1979), narrative writer, essayist, script author, born in Vienna
Georg Trakl, poet

V
Hannelore Valencak (1929–2004), novelist, poet, children's writer

W
Franz Werfel, writer, born in Prague, Austria-Hungary (wrote in German)
Ludwig Wittgenstein, philosopher
Alma Wittlin (1899–1992), historian
Oswald von Wolkenstein (1376–1445), writer and composer

Z
Joseph Christian, Baron von Zedlitz, dramatist and poet
Birgit Zotz (born 1979), writer and anthropologist
Volker Zotz, writer and philosopher
Stefan Zweig (1881–1942), writer, born in Vienna

References

See also 
List of Austrian women writers
List of Austrians
Lists of authors

Writers
Austrians